Nissan Island Airport  is an airfield serving Nissan Island, in the Autonomous Region of Bougainville in Papua New Guinea.

History

World War II

The New Zealand 3rd Division landed on Nissan Island on 15 February 1944 as part of the Solomon Islands campaign. U.S. Navy Seebees from the 33rd, 37th and 93rd Naval Construction Battalions landed with the New Zealanders and began building support facilities. Work on a fighter airstrip began on 20 February and by 5 March a coral-surfaced  by  fighter runway known as Lagoon Airfield was ready for use and aircraft carried out the first attack on Kavieng. Additional airfield facilities such as road and taxiways and a tank farm were also constructed. Construction had been extremely difficult with dense foliage and large trees needing to be removed, rock blasting was necessary, and all coral used for filling had to be quarried at distant locations. Today's air port exists on the site of the "Ocean airfield".

US Navy units based at Nissan Island included:
Special Task Air Group One (STAG-1) operating TDR drones
VMTB-341 operating SBDs from July–December 1944

USMC units based at Nissan Island included:
VMB-423 operating PBJs from July–August 1944
VMB-433 operating PBJs from July–August 1944
VMF-218 operating F4Us from April–November 1944
VMF-222 operating F4Us
VMF-223 operating F4Us

Royal New Zealand Air Force units based at Nissan Island included:

1 Squadron operating Lockheed Venturas from October 1944-January 1945
2 Squadron operating Venturas from January–March 1945
3 Squadron operating Venturas from March–June 1945
14 Squadron operating F4Us from December 1944-January 1945
15 Squadron operating F4Us from February–April 1945
16 Squadron operating F4Us from December 1944-February 1945
17 Squadron operating F4Us from January–March 1945
18 Squadron operating F4Us from November–December 1944
20 Squadron operating F4Us from October–November 1944
21 Squadron operating F4Us from April–May 1945
24 Squadron operating F4Us from March–May 1945

In late 1944 airfield roll-up activities were commenced and were completed by August 1945.

Postwar
Lagoon Airfield was abandoned after the war, while Ocean Airfield remained in use as a civilian airfield.

Airlines and destinations

No known scheduled services.

References

External links
 

Airports in Papua New Guinea
Autonomous Region of Bougainville
1944 establishments in the Territory of New Guinea